Kang Kyung-joon (born February 11, 1983) is a South Korean actor. He made his acting debut in the fifth season of the sitcom Nonstop in 2004, and was the MC of Music Bank from November 6, 2005 to November 19, 2006. After a supporting role in 2012 manga-adapted romantic comedy To the Beautiful You, Kang played leading roles in melodramas Flower of Revenge, Two Women's Room and A Daughter Just Like You.

Filmography

Television series
Welcome to Waikiki (JTBC, 2018)
Sisters-in-Law (MBC, 2017)
A Daughter Just Like You (MBC, 2015)
Two Women's Room (SBS, 2013) 
Flower of Revenge (jTBC, 2013)
7th Grade Civil Servant (MBC, 2013) (cameo)
To the Beautiful You (SBS, 2012)
Daddy's Sorry (TV Chosun, 2012)
History of a Salaryman (SBS, 2012) (cameo)
Cooking Up Romance  (KBS2, 2008)
The Great Catsby (tvN, 2007)
My Beloved Sister (MBC, 2006-2007) 
The Youth in Bare Foot (MBC, 2005)
Single Again (SBS, 2005)
Encounter (MBC, 2005)
Nonstop 5 (MBC, 2004-2005)

Film
My PS Partner (2012) 
Manner of the Battle (2008)

Variety show
Music Bank (KBS2, 2005-2006)
Same Bed, Different Dreams Season 2 (SBS, 2017–present)
Rural Police 4 (MBC every1, 2018)
Law of the Jungle (SBS, 2019)
Handsome Tigers (SBS, 2020)

MV
G.E.M. Long Distance (2015)

Awards
2004 MBC Entertainment Awards: Best Newcomer in a Sitcom/Comedy (Nonstop 5)
2017 MBC Drama Awards: Excellence Award, Actor in a Soap Opera (Sister-in-Law)

References

External links

South Korean male film actors
South Korean male television actors
1983 births
Living people
Konkuk University alumni